In October 1994, Billboard magazine established  Latin Pop Airplay, a chart that ranks the top-performing songs played on Latin pop radio stations in the United States based on weekly airplay data compiled by Nielsen's Broadcast Data Systems (BDS). It is a subchart of Hot Latin Songs, which lists the best-performing Spanish-language songs in the country. According to Billboard, "Latin pop" refers to pop music sung in Spanish. Five songs topped the chart in 1994 while 16 tracks did the same in 1995. Until November 5, 1994, BDS ran tests charts which only listed the number one song of the week on Billboards electronic database. 

The first song to reach number one on the Latin Pop Airplay chart was "Mañana" by Cristian Castro, which was composed and originally performed by Juan Gabriel. Castro was also the artist with the most number-one songs in 1995 with "Con Tu Amor", "Azul Gris", and "Vuélveme a Querer". The latter song held this position for the longest with 14 weeks. Luis Miguel had two number-one songs on the chart in 1994 with "El Día Que Me Quieras" and "La Media Vuelta", the second of which was the final chart-topper of the year and the first at the start of 1995. He achieved his third number one track in 1995 with "Todo y Nada". The three songs were recorded for the album Segundo Romance (1994), in which Luis Miguel covers  ballads from Latin America. Ednita Nazario became the first female artist to have a chart-topper with "Quiero Que Me Hagas el Amor" and achieved her second number one song a year later with "Gata Sin Luna".

Former Timbiriche band member, Claudio Bermúdez (credited for this release simply as Claudio), released his debut album Como Aire Fresco in 1994 which was promoted by its lead single "Ven Junto a Mi". "Ven Junto a Mi" spent seven consecutive weeks on top of the chart in 1995. Despite this level of chart success, the song remains Bermúdez's only number one recording. Selena's "I Could Fall in Love" posthumously became the first English-language song to song to peak at number one on the survey and remains her only number-one song on this chart. Similarly, Lucero and Julio Iglesias obtained their first and only chart-toppers in 1995. Laura Pausini was the only female act to have more than one chart-topper in 1995 with the Spanish-language versions of "Strani amori" ("Amores Extraños") and "Gente". Although it spent only a single week at number one in 1995, "Ese Hombre" by Myriam Hernández was named as the best-performing Latin pop song of the year. The final number one of 1995 was "Más Allá" by Gloria Estefan.

Chart history

Footnotes

See also
1994 in Latin music
1995 in Latin music

References

United States Latin Pop Airplay
United States Latin Pop Airplay
1994 and 1995
1994 in Latin music
1995 in Latin music
1994 in American music
1995 in American music